Yuliana Lizarazo and María Paulina Pérez García defeated Kimberly Birrell and Fernanda Contreras Gómez in the final, 6–3, 5–7, [10–5] to win the doubles tennis title at the 2023 Monterrey Open.

Catherine Harrison and Sabrina Santamaria were the reigning champions, but Harrison chose not to participate this year. Santamaria partnered Kaitlyn Christian, but lost in the quarterfinals to Han Xinyun and Lidziya Marozava.

Seeds

Draw

Draw

References

External links
Main draw

2023 WTA Tour
2023 Monterrey Open - 2